The 2005-06 edition of Copa del Rey de Balonmano was disputed in Almería-Vera, Andalusia. The tournament was played by the 8 first of the Liga ASOBAL when reach the half of the league.

Quarter finals
10 May 2006:

BM Valladolid 36-32  Caja España Ademar León:
BM Granollers 25-27  FC Barcelona Handbol:

11 May 2006:

Portland San Antonio 32-35  BM Ciudad Real:
Keymare Almería 31-34  CAI BM Aragón:

SemiFinals
13 May 2006:

BM Ciudad Real 35-32  CAI BM Aragón:
BM Valladolid 31-29  FC Barcelona Handbol:

Final
14 May 2006:

BM Valladolid 35-30 BM Ciudad Real

See also
 Liga ASOBAL
 Handball in Spain

Copa del Rey de Balonmano seasons
Copa